Acantholipes is a genus of moths in the family Erebidae erected by Julius Lederer in 1857.

Description
Palpi obliquely upturned, where the second joint very broadly fringed with hair and a minute third joint. Thorax and abdomen smoothly scaled and slender. Tibia spineless and no long hairs. Forewings with quadrate or slightly acute apex.

Species
 Acantholipes acephala Strand, 1912
 Acantholipes afar Laporte, 1991
 Acantholipes aurea Berio, 1966
 Acantholipes canofusca Hacker & Saldaitis, 2010
 Acantholipes circumdata (Walker, 1858) (or Acantholipes circumdatus)
 Acantholipes curvilinea Leech, 1900
 Acantholipes germainae Laporte, 1991
 Acantholipes hypenoides Moore, 1881
 Acantholipes juba Swinhoe, 1902
 Acantholipes larentioides Strand, 1920
 Acantholipes namacensis (Guenée, 1852)
 Acantholipes plecopteroides Strand, 1920
 Acantholipes plumbeonitens Hampson, 1926
 Acantholipes regularis (Hübner, [1813])
 Acantholipes regulatrix Wiltshire, 1961
 Acantholipes semiaurea Berio, 1966
 Acantholipes similis Moore, 1879
 Acantholipes singularis Gerasimov, 1931
 Acantholipes tenuipoda Strand, 1920
 Acantholipes trajecta Walker, 1865
 Acantholipes transiens Berio, 1955
 Acantholipes trimeni Felder & Rogenhofer, 1874
 Acantholipes zuboides (Montague, 1914)

Former species
 Acantholipes mesoscota Hampson, 1904

References

Further reading

 
Acantholipini
Noctuoidea genera